Philips is a surname. Notable people with the name include:

 Ambrose Philips (1674–1749), English poet
 Anton Philips (1874–1951), Dutch entrepreneur and co-founder of the Royal Philips Electronics; brother of Gerard Philips
 Bilal Philips (born 1946), Canadian Muslim teacher, speaker, and author
 Edith Philips (1892–1983), American writer and educator
 Emo Philips (born 1956), American comedian
 Frits Philips (1905–2005), Dutch entrepreneur and co-founder of the Royal Philips Electronics company
 Sir George Philips, 1st Baronet (1766–1847), English Member of Parliament
 Sir George Philips, 2nd Baronet (1789–1874), son of the 1st Baronet, English Member of Parliament
 George Morris Philips (1851–1920), American educator and academic administrator
 Gerard Philips (1858–1942), Dutch entrepreneur and co-founder of the Royal Philips Electronics; brother of Anton Philips
 Gina Philips (born 1970), American actress
 Jan Caspar Philips (1690–1775), Dutch engraver
 Judson Philips (1903–1989), American writer
 Katherine Philips (1631–1664), English poet
 Kyle Philips (born 1999), American football player
 Marianne Philips (1886–1951), Dutch writer and politician
 Peter Philips (1560–1628), English composer, organist, and Catholic priest exiled to Flanders

See also
 Philipps, surname
 Philipsz, surname
 Phillips (surname)
 Phillipps, given name and surname

Surnames from given names